This list of Harvard junior fellows includes notable recipients of the fellowship.

(* deceased)

Anthropology

Archaeology

Art history, architecture

Astronomy, astrophysics

Biological sciences

Chemistry

Classics

Economics

Geological sciences

History, cultural studies

History of science

Languages and civilizations, Asian

Languages and literatures, Slavic

Law

Linguistics

Literature, Comparative

Literature, English

Mathematics, mathematical biology

Medicine

Music composition, musicology, music theory

Philosophy, mathematical logic

Physics, applied physics and engineering

Physics, artificial intelligence and computer science

Physiology

Political science

Psychology

Religious studies

Sociology

(* deceased)

References

External links 
 Society of Fellows, Harvard University - official website

Junior Fellows
Junior Fellows
Lists of people by university or college in Massachusetts